Van Vorst is a surname. Notable people with the name include:

Bessie Van Vorst (1873–1928), American author and journalist
Cornelius Van Vorst (1822– 1906), American politician, Mayor of Jersey City, New Jersey
Marie Van Vorst (1867—1936), American writer and artist

See also
Van der Vorst
Van Vorst Township, New Jersey